KV (Kendriya Vidyalaya) IIT Chennai, is an Indian Institute of Technology (IIT) secondary school affiliated to CBSE board in Chennai, India. The current principal is Dr.M.Manickasamy. It was established on 1964. It is part of the Kendriya Vidyalaya Sangathan.

History
Kendriya Vidyalaya Sangathan is an autonomous body set up by the Indian Ministry of Education. To cater to the educational needs of the children of IIT employees, Shri. S. Ramchandran was the first principal of the Vidyalaya, composed of 24 staff members.

The school has divisions for the primary, secondary and senior secondary sections. It is a co-educational institution, with classes from I to XII, affiliated to Central Board of Secondary Education (CBSE), New Delhi.

Over the last forty years, the Vidyalaya has received guidance and support from the ten directors of IIT-chennai and ten principals of the Vidyalaya. Attendance is more than two thousand students. It celebrated its golden jubilee in the year 2013.

Location
KV is located in IIT Chennai campus which is located in Chennai, a suburb in north western Chennai .

Academics
Kedriya Vidyalaya follows the study curriculum set by the Central Board of Secondary Education (CBSE).

References

Kendriya Vidyalayas
Schools in Chennai
Educational institutions established in 1964
1964 establishments in Madras State